The Bezirksliga Main-Hessen was the highest association football league in the German state of Hesse and the Prussian province of Hesse-Nassau from 1927 to 1933. The league was disbanded with the rise of the Nazis to power in 1933.

Overview
The league was formed in 1927, from the clubs of the Bezirksliga Main and the clubs of the north-eastern part of the Bezirksliga Rheinhessen-Saar. The clubs from the Bezirksliga Rheinhessen-Saar which did not become part of the new league were added to the new Bezirksliga Rhein-Saar instead. With the Viktoria Aschaffenburg, the league also included one club from Bavaria.

The league operated from the start in two regional divisions, the Main-division, named after the river Main and the Hessen-division, named after the region of Hesse. The first played with twelve, the second with ten clubs in its first season 1927-28. The clubs in each division played each other in a home-and-away round with the division winners advancing to the Southern German championship, which in turn was a qualification tournament for the German championship. A Bezirksliga final was not played.

The second and third placed team in each division qualified for another round, the Bezirksliga runners-up round, to determine one more team which would gain entry to the German finals.

The leagues were reduced to ten teams in the Main division and nine in the Hessen division in the following season but remained unchanged in modus otherwise. For the 1929-30 season, both divisions then operated on a strength of eight teams, a system that also applied in the following season.

In the 1931-32 season, both divisions expanded in strength, Main to eleven and Hessen to ten teams. The Southern German finals were also reorganised with the top two teams from each division advancing to the Northwest finals group.

In its last season, 1932–33, both divisions operated on a strength of ten clubs.

With the rise of the Nazis to power, the Gauligas were introduced as the highest football leagues in Germany. In the region, the Gauliga Südwest/Mainhessen replaced the Bezirksliga Main-Hessen as the highest level of play. The clubs from the Hanau and Friedberg region however were added to the new Gauliga Hessen.

National success

Southern German championship
Qualified teams and their success:

 1928:
 VfL Neu-Isenburg, 6th place in the Bezirksliga-runners-up round
 Rot-Weiß Frankfurt, 5th place in the Bezirksliga-runners-up round
 FSV Mainz 05, 2nd place in the Bezirksliga-runners-up round
 FSV Frankfurt, Winner of the Bezirksliga-runners-up round, loser division final
 Wormatia Worms, 6th place
 Eintracht Frankfurt, Runners-up
 1929:
 VfL Neu-Isenburg, 8th place in the Bezirksliga-runners-up round
 Union Niederrad, 5th place in the Bezirksliga-runners-up round
 FSV Mainz 05, 4th place in the Bezirksliga-runners-up round
 FSV Frankfurt, Winner of the Bezirksliga-runners-up round, loser division final
 Wormatia Worms, 7th place
 Eintracht Frankfurt, 4th place
 1930:
 Rot-Weiß Frankfurt, 6th place in the Bezirksliga-runners-up round
 VfL Neu-Isenburg, 5th place in the Bezirksliga-runners-up round
 SV Wiesbaden, 3rd place in the Bezirksliga-runners-up round
 FSV Frankfurt, Winner of the Bezirksliga-runners-up round, loser division final
 Wormatia Worms, 7th place
 Eintracht Frankfurt, Southern German champions
 1931: 
 SV Wiesbaden, 8th place in the Bezirksliga-runners-up round
 Union Niederrad, 5th place in the Bezirksliga-runners-up round
 Rot-Weiß Frankfurt, 3rd place in the Bezirksliga-runners-up round
 VfL Neu-Isenburg, 2nd place in the Bezirksliga-runners-up round
 Wormatia Worms, 7th place
 Eintracht Frankfurt, Runners-up
 1932:
 FSV Mainz 05, 8th place northwest division
 Wormatia Worms, 3rd place northwest division
 FSV Frankfurt, 2nd place northwest division, 4th place in Southern German championship
 Eintracht Frankfurt, Southern German champions
 1933:
 FSV Mainz 05, 7th place northsouth division
 Wormatia Worms, 3rd place northsouth division
 Eintracht Frankfurt, 2nd place northsouth division, 3rd place in Southern German championship
 FSV Frankfurt, Southern German champions

German championship
Qualified teams and their success:

 1928:
 Eintracht Frankfurt, First round
 1929:
 none qualified
 1930:
 Eintracht Frankfurt, Quarter-finals
 1931:
 Eintracht Frankfurt, Quarter-finals
 1932: 
 Eintracht Frankfurt, Final
 1933:
 FSV Frankfurt, Quarter-finals
 Eintracht Frankfurt, Semi-finals

Founding members of the league
The 22 founding members of the league and their positions in the 1926-27 season were:

Main division
 Eintracht Frankfurt, runners-up Bezirksliga Main
 FSV Frankfurt, champions Bezirksliga Main
 Rot-Weiß Frankfurt, 4th Bezirksliga Main  
 Union Niederrad, 8th Bezirksliga Main  
 FC Hanau 93, 6th Bezirksliga Main 
 Viktoria Aschaffenburg, 9th Bezirksliga Main  
 Kickers Offenbach, 3rd Bezirksliga Main 
 SpVgg Fechenheim, promoted from second tier 
 Sport 1860 Hanau, promoted from second tier  
 VfR Offenbach, promoted from second tier 
 Viktoria Hanau, 10th Bezirksliga Main 
 Germania 94 Frankfurt, 7th Bezirksliga Main

Hessen division
 Wormatia Worms, 3rd Bezirksliga Rheinhessen-Saar 
 FSV Mainz 05, champions Bezirksliga Rheinhessen-Saar
 VfL Neu-Isenburg, 5th Bezirksliga Main 
 SV Wiesbaden, 4th Bezirksliga Rheinhessen-Saar 
 TSG Höchst, promoted from second tier  
 Alemannia Worms, 8th Bezirksliga Rheinhessen-Saar  
 Hassia Bingen, 5th Bezirksliga Rheinhessen-Saar  
 SpVgg Arheiligen, promoted from second tier  
 SV Darmstadt 98, 6th Bezirksliga Rhein 
 Germania Wiesbaden, promoted from second tier

Winners of the Bezirksliga Main-Hessen

Placings in the Bezirksliga Main-Hessen 1927-33

Main division

Source:
 The Sport 1860 Hanau and Viktoria Hanau merged in 1928 to form SpVgg Hanau.

Hessen division

Source:

References

Sources
 Fussball-Jahrbuch Deutschland  (8 vol.), Tables and results of the German tier-one leagues 1919-33, publisher: DSFS
 Kicker Almanach,  The yearbook on German football from Bundesliga to Oberliga, since 1937, published by the Kicker Sports Magazine
 Süddeutschlands Fussballgeschichte in Tabellenform 1897-1988  History of Southern German football in tables, publisher & author: Ludolf Hyll

External links
 The Gauligas  Das Deutsche Fussball Archiv 
 German league tables 1892-1933  Hirschi's Fussball seiten
 Germany - Championships 1902-1945 at RSSSF.com

1
1927 establishments in Germany
1933 disestablishments in Germany
Football competitions in Hesse
Football competitions in Rhineland-Palatinate
Southern German football championship